José Claudio Wílliman (1925–2006) was a Uruguayan lawyer and political figure.

Background
Wílliman was born in Montevideo. A Doctor of Laws, he was a university teacher for many years. His grandfather, Claudio Wílliman was a Colorado Party President of Uruguay 1907–1911.

Political activities and office

José Claudio Wílliman was a prominent member of the Uruguayan National (Blanco) Party. As a younger man, he was involved with Ruralist activism.

He served in the Uruguayan Senate 1985–1990.

Death

He died in 2006.

See also

 Politics of Uruguay
 List of political families#Uruguay

References
 :es:José Claudio Williman

References

People from Montevideo
Members of the Senate of Uruguay
20th-century Uruguayan lawyers
20th-century Uruguayan historians
Uruguayan people of French descent
French people of Galician descent
1925 births
2006 deaths
National Party (Uruguay) politicians